Benjamin Hale Settle (born 1947) is a senior United States district judge of the United States District Court for the Western District of Washington.

Education and career
Born in Olympia, Washington, Settle received a Bachelor of Arts degree from Claremont McKenna College in 1969 and a Juris Doctor from Willamette University College of Law in 1972. He was in private practice in Washington in 1972, and again from 1976 to 2007. From 1973 to 1976, he was a captain in the United States Army Judge Advocate General's Corps as a defense council stationed at Fort Lewis, Washington.

Federal judicial service

On January 9, 2007, Settle was nominated by President George W. Bush to a seat on the United States District Court for the Western District of Washington vacated by Frank Burgess. Settle was confirmed by the United States Senate on June 28, 2007, and received his commission on July 2, 2007. He assumed senior status on January 1, 2020.

Sources

1947 births
Living people
Judges of the United States District Court for the Western District of Washington
Willamette University College of Law alumni
United States district court judges appointed by George W. Bush
21st-century American judges
United States Army officers
People from Olympia, Washington
Claremont McKenna College alumni
United States Army Judge Advocate General's Corps